The Palestine national football team, controlled by the Palestinian Football Association, represents Palestine in association football. The squad is governed by the Asian Football Confederation (AFC) continentally, and FIFA worldwide.

A football federation in Mandatory Palestine was founded in 1928. While a team for the Arab residents of Palestine played its first match in 1953, the national team was nearly recognized by FIFA in 1998, after the creation of the Palestinian National Authority. The same year, Palestine played their first FIFA-recognized match in a 3–1 defeat to Lebanon in a friendly. The team has won the 2014 AFC Challenge Cup, thanks to a 1–0 win over the Philippines in the final. Their win in the competition qualified them to the 2015 AFC Asian Cup, marking their first appearance in the competition. Palestine also qualified to the following edition of the Asian Cup in 2019, their first through regular qualification. They have yet to qualify for the World Cup.

The Palestinian team is known by various nicknames: "Lions of Canaan", "the Fedayeen" and "the Knights". Their main colours are red and white. The team reached an all-time high position of 73rd in the FIFA ranking in February 2018 after going on a 12-match unbeaten streak, from 29 March 2016 to 22 March 2018. Palestine's main venue is the Faisal Al-Husseini International Stadium in Al-Ram; however, they have been forced to play in neutral stadiums for home matches in numerous occasions due to travel restrictions imposed by Israel.

History

1928–1998: The beginning 
Maccabi leader Yosef Yekutieli attempted for Maccabi Association's membership in the Fédération Internationale de Football Association (FIFA) as early as 1925. The application was turned down, as only associations representing states could be admitted as members. Yekutieli thus decided to create the Palestine Football Association (PFA). Maccabi officials were obliged to include Arab teams. The association's first session was held in the summer of 1928. Notwithstanding the fourteen Jewish representatives that partook, one Arab delegate participated – an individual representing Arab Sports Club of Jerusalem. FIFA accepted the PFA on 17 May 1929 and during the first years of the PFA, Arab clubs partook in PFA sanctioned-matches. During this time, 11 of the 69 PFA teams were Arab, but after the mid-1930s, until its transformation into the IFA, its membership became largely Jewish with only minor Arab membership.

The Arab Palestinian Sports Federation (APSF) was born in April 1931 due to the belief that the PFA did not represent Arab interests. A Palestinian national team played its first match against a squad from the American University of Beirut in the same year according to Falastin. Due to the 1936 revolt, the activities of the APSF were hampered and the federation completely disappeared toward the end of the 1930s.

While the PFA was established in 1928, the first international match played by Palestine was an 8–1 defeat away to Egypt in 1953. The last game saw Palestine lose to Libya 5–2, to finish bottom of the group.

At the 1965 Pan Arab Games, Palestine were grouped with Aden, Iraq, Lebanon and the United Arab Republic. They finished second, thus advancing to the semi-finals for the first time. Palestine faced Sudan and were beaten 2–1. In the third place play-off, Palestine met Libya, where they lost 4–2. Palestine participated in the 1966 Arab Cup held in Iraq; they were drawn in Group B alongside Syria, Libya and North Yemen. Starting with a 0–0 draw to Libya, Palestine beat North Yemen 7–0 before losing 3–1 to Syria. They ended the tournament with four points and failed to qualify to the knock-out stages of the competition.

Palestine were drawn alongside Libya, North Yemen and Syria in the 1966 Arab Cup. With one win, a draw and a loss, Palestine was eliminated in the group stage.

The national team participated in the 1976 Pan Arab Games, held in Damascus. Palestine started their campaign with two defeats to Morocco (3–0) and Saudi Arabia (3–1), before defeating Jordan (2–1). They lost to hosts Syria (2–0) in their fourth game of the tournament, drew against South Yemen (0–0), and finished with a win against Mauritania (1–0) to end the tournament in 6th place. Palestine participated in the 1992 Arab Cup held in Syria; they were drawn in Group B alongside the hosts and Saudi Arabia but were eliminated from the group stage after one draw and one loss.

1998–2014: International recognition 
In May 1995, the PFA was granted the status of provisional member in FIFA. Palestine eventually gained FIFA membership on 8 June 1998 after numerous attempts since 1946. Under Ricardo Carugati, Palestine played their first official matches in July 1998 against Lebanon, Jordan and Syria at the 1998 Arab Cup qualification.

In the next year, Palestine took part in the 1999 Pan Arab Games held in Jordan. There, they won games against Qatar and the United Arab Emirates, drew with Libya and Syria, while only losing to hosts Jordan. Palestine finished in the third-place which is their best result to date. In their first ever Asian Cup qualification, Palestine were drawn into a five-team group with Jordan, Kazakhstan, Pakistan, and Qatar. A single victory 2–0 against Pakistan proved to be not enough to qualify as they lost 1–0 to Qatar, 5–1 to Jordan before finishing the campaign with a 2–0 defeat to Kazakhstan.

Managed by Mustafa Yacoub, Palestine drew into Group C of the 2002 World Cup qualification along with Hong Kong, Malaysia and Qatar. The team finished in a good second place scoring 8 goals thanks to Emad Ayoub who netted four times. In the 2002 Arab Cup, Palestine crashed out of the group stage, but managed to draw against group winners Jordan, Kuwait and Sudan, whose only losses were against eventual semifinalist Morocco. Under Nicola Hadwa Shahwan, the team were drawn alongside Kuwait, Qatar and Singapore. Palestine finished last with two points.

After a failed Asian Cup qualifying campaign, the PFA hired Austrian coach Alfred Riedl to lead the team during the 2006 FIFA World Cup qualification. Palestine was included in a group with Uzbekistan, Iraq and Chinese Taipei. They won both games against Chinese Taipei, drew 2–2 with Iraq, however this was insufficient for Palestine to advance beyond the second round as they lost both fixtures versus Uzbekistan 3–0 apart from a 3–0 defeat at the hands of Iraq. Palestine took part in the inaugural AFC Challenge Cup held in Bangladesh. They were drawn alongside the host team, Cambodia and Guam. In the group stage, Palestine registered their biggest win ever, a 11–0 victory over Guam. Palestine advanced from Group C and met Kyrgyzstan in the quarter-finals. After playing a goal-lees first half, they were beaten with a last-gasp goal. In the summer of 2006, Palestine achieved its highest FIFA ranking at 115, placing them 16th in the Asian continent.

Managed by Azmi Nassar, Palestine were drawn with China national football team, Iraq and Singapore during the 2007 Asian Cup qualification. Palestine finished in the bottom with 4 points. They achieved their only win against Singapore 1–0.

In 2008, with the help of FIFA's goal program, the PFA built the Faisal Al-Husseini International Stadium, and on 26 October 2008. Palestine held a match at their home for the first time since they became member of FIFA, a 1–1 draw with Jordan ahead of a crowd of over 7,000. Palestine entered the first round of 2010 World Cup qualification and were eliminated after only one match that finished 4–0 for Singapore. The second leg was not played as scheduled due to the Palestinian team being barred from travelling. However the FIFA refused to reschedule the match.

The 2010 AFC Challenge Cup qualifying draw put Palestine in Group C, with Afghanistan (later withdrew), Kyrgyzstan and Nepal. They started the run with a goalless draw against hosts Nepal. The final game finished in a 1–1 draw with Kyrgyzstan to miss the chance of qualification on goal difference.

Palestine drew into group C with Jordan, Libya and Sudan for the 2011 Pan Arab Games. They lost the opening match 4–1 to Jordan in Doha. The team improved in the second match against Libya which finished 1–1. The last game against Sudan was won by Palestine 2–0 to clinch the second-place berth in the tournament. At the semi-finals they lost 3–1 to Bahrain. The team completed their campaign with a 3–0 loss to Kuwait after extra time.

During the 2014 FIFA World Cup qualifiers, Palestine were drawn with Afghanistan in the first round. The first leg was won 2–0, while the second leg ended in a draw 1–1. On 3 July 2011, the first World Cup qualifying match played at home, Palestine took the lead with a long-range shot by Houssam Wadi. Palestine reached the second round to face Thailand. The first match was lost 1–0 in Buriram, while in the second match, Palestine produced a better performance with Murad Alyan taking the lead early, before Thailand responded before half-time. The second half was similar and two teams waited until the dying minutes before scoring back-to-back goals. This resulted in Palestine's elimination.

The PFA chose not to renew Moussa Bezaz's contract after exiting the second round of the 2014 FIFA World Cup qualifying. Jamal Mahmoud, a former player and manager of Al-Wehdat, was announced as the national team manager in November 2011, after two disastrous friendly matches, without a permanent manager saw defeats against Indonesia and Iran 4–1 and 7–0, respectively. Palestine made history by playing and defeating their first UEFA rival Azerbaijan, on 2–0. The match was later registered as unofficial for unknown reasons.

Mahmoud later led the team in the 2012 AFC Challenge Cup. In the run-up, Palestine finished group play at the 2012 AFC Challenge Cup without conceding a goal after 2–0 wins over Nepal and Maldives alongside a 0–0 draw against Turkmenistan on the way to a semifinal exit at the hands of eventual champions North Korea. The third place play-off ended in a 4–3 loss against the Philippines. During the 2014 AFC Challenge Cup qualification, Palestine drew into Group D with Bangladesh, Nepal and the Northern Mariana Islands. They started with a hard win against Bangladesh 1–0. The next game ended in a 9–0 rout over the Northern Mariana Islands. The qualifiers finished in a goalless draw against Nepal to earn a second straight AFC Challenge Cup berth.

2014–present: Recent success 

The team ended up winning the 2014 AFC Challenge Cup by drawing only one of the 5 matches without conceding a goal. In the opening match, Palestine won against Kyrgyzstan with a last-gasp goal by Abdelhamid Abuhabib. In the next group game, they played against Myanmar and won 2–0. The ended the first round with a 0–0 draw against hosts Maldives. Palestine advanced as group winners to the semi-finals where they faced Afghanistan. The match ended in favor of the Palestinians with a 2–0 win. At the final, Palestine clinched the win over the Philippines with a lone goal scored by Ashraf Nu'man through a free-kick. The victory gave the Palestine team their first major trophy and guaranteed their participation in the next year's AFC Asian Cup. Following its 2014 AFC Challenge Cup win and qualification for the Asian Cup, Jamal Mahmoud resigned as national team manager citing differences with the Palestine Football Association.

Palestine was placed in Group D along with Japan, Jordan and Iraq in the 2015 AFC Asian Cup having lost all three group matches. They started their campaign with a 0–4 defeat by Japan. In the second game Palestine were beaten 1–5, with the opposing team ending the first half with a 3 goals lead. In the second half, Palestine scored their first ever Asian Cup goal by Jaka Ihbeisheh six minutes before the end. However, at this point they were eliminated. The participation ended with a 0–2 defeat to Iraq. After a disastrous performance in the 2015 AFC Asian Cup, the PFA appointed Olympic team manager Abdel Nasser Barakat as national team manager, who then decided not to pick several veteran players as the team moved to overhaul.

Palestine registered two 6–0 wins over Malaysia during 2018 World Cup qualifying. Those results, combined with a 0–0 draw at home to Saudi Arabia and the United Arab Emirates, placed Palestine close to qualification for the third round of Asian World Cup qualifiers. They were eliminated from the qualification following a 2–0 defeat to the UAE on 24 March 2016. They won their final FIFA World Cup qualification match at home 7–0 against Timor-Leste, five days later.

Although eliminated from the World Cup, Palestine advanced to the third round of the 2019 AFC Asian Cup qualification. Drawn with Oman, the Maldives and Bhutan, Palestine came second in the group with five wins and one defeat, and qualified to the 2019 AFC Asian Cup for the first time through regular qualification. Between February and March 2018, Palestine reached their best ever FIFA ranking of 73rd, thanks to an unprecedented 12-match unbeaten streak (between 29 March 2016 and 22 March 2018), winning eight and drawing four. In February 2018, Palestine achieved their best-ever FIFA ranking (73rd).

On 19 December 2017, Julio César Baldivieso was hired after Abdel Nasser Barakat was released. The hiring was widely criticized by Palestinian fans. On 22 April 2018, the PFA appointed Noureddine Ould Ali as head coach to lead the team in the next period. Palestine was crowned champion of the 2018 Bangabandhu Cup as an invited country to the tournament. In the road to the final, they topped their group with 6 points, defeating Tajikistan 2–0 before winning against Nepal 1–0 with a Khaled Salem header. In the semi-final Palestine knocked out Bangladesh 2–0 with the goals coming in each half. At the final, Palestine played Tajikistan for the second time. The match ended 0–0 in regular time, to be decided in a penalty shoot-out which Palestine won 4–3.

Drawn with Australia, Syria and Jordan, Palestine started their 2019 AFC Asian Cup campaign on 6 January 2019 with a 0–0 draw to Syria. Five days later, Palestine faced title-holders Australia; a header by Jamie Maclaren and a goal by Awer Mabil sent Palestine trailing 2–0 at half-time. Australia sealed the win with a 90th-minute header from Apostolos Giannou. On 15 January 2019, Palestine headed into their last group-stage match needing all three points against Jordan, and hoping for a Syria win against Australia. In the 17th minute, Palestine came close to scoring when Amer Shafi produced a fingertip save to keep out Abdelatif Bahdari. In the second half, Oday Dabbagh failed to score from two headers, and the match ended in a 0–0 draw.

Between July and August 2019, Palestine participated in the 2019 WAFF Championship; they were drawn with hosts Iraq, Syria, Lebanon, and Yemen. Palestine ended the tournament with two wins, one draw and one defeat, and finished in second place in their group: however, this wasn't enough to reach the final.

Palestine were drawn with Saudi Arabia, Singapore, Uzbekistan, Yemen at the 2022 World Cup qualification. They kicked-off with a historic win over Uzbekistan 2–0 in Al-Ram. Five days later, Palestine were defeated 2–1 to Singapore. On 15 October 2019, Palestine drew 0–0 with Saudi Arabia, during which its decades-long boycott of play in the West Bank came to an end in protest against Israel's control over Palestinian territories. Thereafter, the team lost again to Yemen 1–0. This was later followed with another away loss to Uzbekistan, thus placing Palestine in the bottom and reducing the country's opportunity to reach the final round. 

Manager Noureddine Ould Ali lost his job after 2022 World Cup qualification resumed in 2021 following a 5–0 loss to Saudi Arabia. He was replaced by Makram Dabboub who won his first World Cup qualifiers against Singapore and Yemen, 4–0 and 3–0, respectively. 

In June 2022, Palestine qualified for their third straight AFC Asian Cup finals, winning all three games against Mongolia, Yemen and Philippines without conceding a goal.

Problems relating to the Israeli–Palestinian conflict
The Palestinian Football Association faces problems in training and playing due to the Israeli–Palestinian conflict.

Because of travel restrictions placed by Israel upon people in the West Bank and Gaza Strip and the difficulty in obtaining an exit visa from Israel, many players in the team are drawn from the Palestinian diaspora, from as far away as Chile and the United States. Recently, Israel's refusal to issue exit visas has resulted in players, or in some case the entire team, being unable to represent the territories. In November 2006 (the last match of 2007 AFC Asian Cup qualification group stage is scheduled), all players based inside the West Bank and Gaza Strip were denied exit visas. The AFC cancelled the match since both teams had been eliminated from the competition by virtue of their previous results against China and Iraq. A film, Goal Dreams, was made about the team attempting to overcome obstacles in the qualification for the 2006 World Cup, who were also featured on the BBC documentary series Frontline Football.

In October 2007, the second leg of a crucial 2010 World Cup qualifier between Palestine and Singapore was not played due to Palestine's inability to obtain exit visas. The AFC and FIFA decided not to reschedule the match despite protests from the PFA, and Singapore was awarded a 3–0 win in a walkover match. In May 2008, the team was not allowed to travel to the 2008 AFC Challenge Cup.  After a 2011 World Cup qualifier against Thailand, two starters, Mohammed Samara and Majed Abusidu, were refused entry to the West Bank and therefore could not travel back with the team from Thailand.

Striker Ziyad Al-Kord was prevented from travelling and had his house destroyed. Tariq al Quto was killed by the Israel Defense Forces, and during Operation Cast Lead, three Palestinian footballers, Ayman Alkurd, Shadi Sbakh and Wajeh Moshtahe, were among the Palestinian casualties.

Mahmoud Sarsak was administratively detained by Israel in July 2009 for being a member of the Islamic Jihad Movement in Palestine; following a hunger strike and international pressure on his behalf from FIFA president Sepp Blatter, he was released in July 2012. In 2012, Olympic Team goalkeeper Omar Abu Ruways was arrested by Israel.

Sameh Maraaba was arrested in April after returning with his team from training in Qatar. The Shin Bet accused Maraaba of exploiting his status as a Palestinian football player to act as a courier for Hamas. Shin Bet released a statement in which it was contended that Maraaba admitted that, before he left for Qatar, he met a senior Hamas operative in Kalkilya, asked him to meet an operative from Hamas' military wing in Qatar and received money, a cellphone and written messages which he brought back to Kalkilya.

Palestinian facilities, such as the Palestine Stadium, have been damaged in military conflicts.

In addition, Israeli forces have been accused of intentionally shooting Palestinian footballers in the knees and feet, including on one occasion ten bullets in the feet of 19 year old footballer Jawhar Nasser Jawhar.

The team's former goalkeeper Abu Rwayyis was arrested in connection with an attack on Israeli occupation force soldiers in April 2012.

Results and fixtures 

The following is a list of match results in the last 12 months, as well as any future matches that have been scheduled.

2022

2023

Coaching staff

Coaching history

  Ricardo Carugati (1998)
  Azmi Nassar (1999–2000)
  Mansour Hamid El Bouri (2000)
  Mustafa Abdel-Ghali Yacoub (2001)
  Andrzej Wiśniewski (2002)
  Nicola Hadwa (2002–2004)
  Alfred Riedl (2004)
  Tamás Viczkó (2004)
  Azmi Nassar (2005–2007)
  Nelson Dekmak (2007)
  Ezzat Hamza (2008–2009)
  Jamal Daraghmeh (2009)
  Mousa Bezaz (2009–2011)
  Abdel Nasser Barakat (2011)
  Jamal Mahmoud (2011–2014)
  Saeb Jendeya (2014–2015)
  Ahmed Al-Hassan (2015)
  Abdel Nasser Barakat (2015–2017)
  Julio César Baldivieso (2017–2018)
  Noureddine Ould Ali (2018–2021)
  Makram Daboub (2021–)

Players

Current squad
The following 26 players were called up for the 2023 AFC Asian Cup qualification – Third Round qualifying matches against Mongolia, Yemen, and Philippines on June 8, 11, and 14 respectively.

Caps and goals as of 14 June 2022, after the match against Philippines.

Recent call-ups 
The following footballers were part of a national selection in the past 12 months, but are not part of the current squad.

Player records 

Players in bold are still active with Palestine.

Competitive record 

, the complete official match record of the Palestine national team comprises 229 matches: 66 wins, 57 draws and 106 losses. During these matches, the team scored 291 times and conceded 357 goals. Palestine's highest winning margin is 11 goals, which has been achieved against Guam in 2006 (11–0). Their longest winning streak is 7 wins, and their unbeaten record is 12 consecutive official matches.

FIFA World Cup

AFC Asian Cup

AFC Challenge Cup

WAFF Championship

FIFA Arab Cup

Pan Arab Games

Asian Games

Other tournaments

Palestine Cup of Nations

See also 

List of men's national association football teams
West Bank Premier League
Gaza Strip Premier League
Football in Palestine
Sport in Palestine

Notes and references

References

External links 

 
FIFA team profile
AFC team profile 
WAFF team profile 
ELO team records

 
Asian national association football teams
AFC Challenge Cup-winning countries